Pinocchio is the boy-puppet from the 1883 novel The Adventures of Pinocchio by Italian author Carlo Collodi.

Pinocchio may also refer to:

Film and television productions and characters

 Pinocchio (1940 film), the Walt Disney Animation Studios animated film
 Pinocchio (1957 TV-musical), live-action adaptation starring Mickey Rooney
 The New Adventures of Pinocchio (TV-series), 1960 Rankin-Bass stop-motion animated production
 Pinocchio (1967 film), an East German film 
 Pinocchio (1968 film), a Hallmark Hall of Fame live-action TV special
 Pinocchio: The Series, a 1972 anime adaptation from the Tatsunoko Production studio
 Pinocchio (1976 TV musical), a live-action adaptation starring Sandy Duncan and Danny Kaye
 Pinocchio, character in Piccolino no Bōken (The Adventures of Piccolino), 1976 anime television series from Nippon Animation
 Pinocchio (1978 TV-series), a 4-part BBC live-action adaptation produced and directed by Barry Letts
 "Pinocchio", episode title and character in the 1984 children's live-action TV series Faerie Tale Theatre
 Pinocchio and the Emperor of the Night, 1987 animated production from Filmation
 Pinocchio (video game), a 1995 platform puzzle adventure game
 The New Adventures of Pinocchio (film), a 1999 live-action adaptation starring Gabriel Thomson and Martin Landau
 Pinocchio, a character played by Seth Adkins in the 2000 live-action adaptation Geppetto
 Pinocchio (2002 film), a live-action production starring Roberto Benigni and Carlo Giuffrè
 Pinocchio 3000, a 2004 Canadian computer-animated adaptation featuring a robotic title character
 Pinocchio (2008 film), a live-action adaptation starring Robbie Kay and Bob Hoskins
 Pinocchio (2012 film), an Italian animated production from Enzo D'Alò
 Pinocchio (2014 TV series), a Korean television series
 Pinocchio (2019 film), an Italian feature adaptation directed by Matteo Garrone, starring Federico Ielapi and Roberto Benigni
 Pinocchio (2022 live-action film), a 2022 live-action film made by Disney
 Guillermo del Toro's Pinocchio, a 2022 animated film co-directed by Guillermo del Toro and Mark Gustafson
 Pinocchio: A True Story, a 2022 Russian animated film

Works titled "The Adventures of Pinocchio"

Characters in film and TV
 Pinocchio (Disney character), character from the 1940 Disney film Pinocchio
 Pinocchio (Once Upon a Time) (also known as August W. Booth), a character from the ABC television series Once Upon a Time (and related print media)
 Pinocchio (Shrek), a character from the Shrek media franchise
 Pinocchio, a character from Gunslinger Girl manga and anime, 2002 and onward
 Mike Pinocchio, character from the 1999 live-action TV series Harsh Realm played by D. B. Sweeney

Music

Works titled "The Adventures of Pinocchio"

Stage productions
 Disney's My Son Pinocchio: Geppetto's Musical Tale, a 2006 American musical by Stephen Schwartz
 Pinocchio (Boesmans), French-language opera 2017
 Pinocchio (play), featuring the songs from the 1940 Disney film
 Pinocchio (1996 musical), a Seattle musical by Chad Henry and Stevie Kallos

Artists
 Pin-Occhio, an Italian electronic band 
 Pinocchio (singer), a fictional French animated character and singer, active 2005–2008

Albums and soundtracks
 Pinocchio (f(x) album), a 2011 Korean-language album from the girl group F(x)
 Pinocchio (soundtrack), a 1940 soundtrack album
 Pinocchio (Original Soundtrack), a 2022 soundtrack album from the Disney film
 Pinocchio (Soundtrack from the Netflix Film)
 Pinocchio, a 2002 album by Italian band Pooh

Songs
 "Pinocchio (Danger)", a Korean song by f(x)
 "Pinocchio" (instrumental), an instrumental composed by Fiorenzo Carpi in 1972
 "Pinocchio", a single by Brian and Michael 1979
 "Pinocchio", a song by Maria Dallas, 1970
 "Pinocchio", a song by Wayne Shorter from the 1968 album Nefertiti
 "Pinocchio", a song by Manu Chao from the 2002 album Radio Bemba Sound System
 "Pinocchio Story", a song by Kanye West from the 2008 album 808s & Heartbreak

Other

 12927 Pinocchio, an asteroid
 Pinocchio (Fables), a character from the Fables comic book series
 Pinocchio (spider), a genus of cellar spiders
 Pinocchio paradox, a version of the liar paradox
 "Pinocchios", a rating system used by Glenn Kessler in political fact checking for The Washington Post

See also
 The New Adventures of Pinocchio (disambiguation)
 Piel Pinocchio II, a single-seat, single-engine aerobatic sport aircraft developed in France